The Sevuralboksitruda (split up as 'Sev. Ural Boksit Ruda', meaning 'North Urals Bauxite Ore Deposit') company is a very large bauxite-mining concern in Russia, owned by RUSAL.  It is based in the town of Severouralsk in Sverdlovsk Oblast, and works bauxite deposits in Cheryomukhovsky, Kalyinsky and Novokalyinsky, including the "Krasnaya shapochka" ('little red riding hood') deposit which was discovered in 1934.  It extracted more than 3.8 million tons of bauxite in 2000, which were processed at the Bogoslovsky and Urals aluminium plants.

Mining companies of Russia
Rusal
Companies based in Sverdlovsk Oblast
Mining companies of the Soviet Union